Carex commixta is a tussock-forming species of perennial sedge in the family Cyperaceae. It is native to temperate parts of the south-eastern Asia and northern Malesia.

See also
List of Carex species

References

commixta
Plants described in 1855
Taxa named by Ernst Gottlieb von Steudel
Flora of Hainan
Flora of Java
Flora of Myanmar
Flora of Sumatra
Flora of Thailand
Flora of Vietnam